Vinu Udani Siriwardana (Sinhala:විනු උදානි සිරිවර්ධන) (born March 10, 1992) is a Sri Lankan actress, model and TV presenter. In 2012 she participated in the "Derana Veet Miss Sri Lanka for Miss World 2012" pageant and succeeded in becoming the joint winner for the title  'Derana Veet Miss Sri Lanka for Miss World 2012' with  Sumudu Prasadini (the latter represented Sri Lanka at the Miss World 2012 beauty pageant).

Miss Sri Lanka for Miss World 2012
Error in calculation 
Vinu won the 'Derana Veet Miss Sri Lanka for Miss World 2012' title at the official event held on 31 March 2012 at Blue Water, Wadduwa. On that day Sumudu Prasadini was chosen as the 1st runner- up of the beauty pageant. However, it was later revealed that a calculation error had occurred and on 4 April 2012, Sumudu Prasadini was crowned the winner of the pageant at a ceremony held  at Galle Face Hotel, Colombo. It was concluded that both, Vinu and Sumudu would share the main title and that Sumudu would represent Sri Lanka at the Miss World 2012 pageant held in China on August 18, 2012.

In addition to the main title, Vinu also won the title 'Miss Talent' at one of the mini pageants held during the event and the title 'Sunday Observer Most Popular contestant' by receiving the highest number of public votes through the Sunday Observer newspaper.

Miss Tourism Queen of the Year International
Vinu also represented Sri Lanka at 18th Miss Tourism Queen of the Year International pageant, which was held in Nanjing, China and competed for the main title as well as two mini titles - 'Best in Talent' and 'Best National Costume'. At this competition, she succeeded in making into the top ten finalists in 'Best in Talent' and top 25 in 'Best National Costume' titles.

Acting career
Vinu started her acting career through the teledrama Pipena Mal  playing the supporting role of Parami. But her most notable performance as an actress was the character "Tharumalee" in the teledrama Tharumalee and Wes teledrama. In addition to acting in teledramas, Vinu has also proven her talent through acting in several music videos.

Filmography

Personal life
Vinu is the second in her family with an elder brother (Sanu) and a younger sister (Ruvi). She is a past pupil of Anula Vidyalaya. Currently she lives in Dehiwala with her family. She is married.

Recently she was awarded the Nelson Mendala Peace Awards 2019. In addition, she worked as the host of the Friday Hada Redi Peya program. She also plans to write a book. She married Advance level Economics and Business studies lecturer Mr. Kasun Liyanage on 28 August 2020.

References

External links
News in Pictures

1992 births
Living people
Sri Lankan film actresses
Sri Lankan television actresses
Sri Lankan beauty pageant winners